Gabonese passports are issued to Gabonese citizens to travel outside Gabon.

As of 1 January 2017, Gabonese citizens had visa-free or visa on arrival access to 50 countries and territories, ranking the Gabonese passport 86th in terms of travel freedom (tied with Haitian and Malagasy passports) according to the Henley visa restrictions index.

See also
Visa requirements for Gabonese citizens
List of passports

References

External links

Passports by country
Government of Gabon